Roshi Motman is the first woman to become the Chief Executive Officer of Tigo, Ghana.

Education 
She studied Electrical Engineering and Business Development at Chalmers University in Goteborg, Sweden.

Career 
She has about ten years experience working with various companies in the Kinnevik Group, a key investor in Millicom. She occupied the roles of  Product management, Sales and Customer Operations at Tele2 in Sweden. At Tele2, she was also responsible for development of mobile entertainment at Modern Times Group, parent company of TV channel Viasat. She served as the Chief Executive Officer of Tigo, Ghana till June 2018 to pursue new opportunities

Awards and recognition
 Roshi won the 2015 COM World Series AfricanCom Awards for CEO of the year in 2015. 
 She was also recognized as a trailblazer at the 5th Ghana Telcom Awards in May 2015. 
 She was also named second on the Sweden's list of 75 young and promising women.
 Roshi was ranked among 2016’s Top 50 Corporate Women Leaders in Ghana.

References

Living people
Chalmers University of Technology alumni
Year of birth missing (living people)